Wayne Dewey Brenkert (March 5, 1898 – August 1, 1979) was a professional American football player-coach for the Akron Pros. Prior to his professional career, he attended Washington & Jefferson College.

References

External links
 

1898 births
1979 deaths
American football halfbacks
American football quarterbacks
Player-coaches
Akron Pros coaches
Akron Pros players
Washington & Jefferson Presidents football players
People from Highland Park, Michigan
Players of American football from Michigan